Without Me may refer to:

"Without Me" (Eminem song), 2002
"Without Me" (Fantasia Barrino song), 2013
"Without Me" (Halsey song), 2018
"Without Me", a song by Collective Soul from See What You Started by Continuing, 2015